Giovanni Antonio Licinio the younger (c. 1515–1576), nicknamed Il Sacchiense, was an Italian painter, a brother of Giulio Licinio, and a nephew and pupil of Il Pordenone. He died in Como, Italy.

References

Italian Renaissance painters
16th-century Italian painters
Italian male painters
Painters from Lombardy